Girolamo Zacconi (died 1558) was a Roman Catholic prelate who served as Bishop of Strongoli (1541–1558).

Biography
On 20 May 1541, Girolamo Zacconi was appointed by Pope Paul III as Bishop of Strongoli.
He served as Bishop of Strongoli until his resignation in 1558.

See also 
Catholic Church in Italy

References

External links and additional sources
 (for Chronology of Bishops) 
 (for Chronology of Bishops) 

16th-century Italian Roman Catholic bishops
1558 deaths
Bishops appointed by Pope Paul III